Fujitani (written: 藤谷, 富士谷 or 冨士谷) is a Japanese surname. Notable people with the surname include:

, Japanese writer and actress
, Japanese politician
, Japanese actress
, Japanese actress
, Japanese academic and linguist
, Japanese footballer
, Japanese footballer

Japanese-language surnames